Aldéric-Joseph Benoit (December 26, 1877 – July 16, 1968) was a Canadian politician. He was elected to the House of Commons of Canada as a Member of the Liberal Party in 1922 to represent the riding of St. Johns—Iberville. He was re-elected in 1925 and 1926.

External links

1877 births
1968 deaths
Members of the House of Commons of Canada from Quebec
Liberal Party of Canada MPs
People from Centre-du-Québec